This is list of South African animated films. It includes theatrical films, some important short films, and international films in which South Africa's production houses and studios were involved.

Notable short films

Feature films

Footnotes

See also

References

Lists of animated films

Animated